Coatepeque Airport  is an airport serving Coatepeque, a city in the Quetzaltenango Department of Guatemala. The airport is in a wooded area on the southwest side of town.

It has a small terminal and a runway 900 meters long.

See also
 Transport in Guatemala
 List of airports in Guatemala

References

External links
 OpenStreetMap - Coatepeque
 FallingRain - Coatepeque Airport
 OurAirports - Coatepeque
 

Airports in Guatemala
Quetzaltenango Department